Tadashi Maeda may refer to:
 Tadashi Maeda (admiral) (1898–1977), Imperial Japanese Navy officer during the Pacific War
 Tadashi Maeda (politician) (1946–2013), Japanese politician who served two terms in the House of Representatives
 Tadashi Maeda (banker) (born 1957), executive of the Japan Bank for International Cooperation